The 1992–93 FIS Cross-Country World Cup was the 12th official World Cup season in cross-country skiing for men and women. The World Cup started in Ramsau, Austria, on 12 December 1992 and finished in Štrbské Pleso, Slovakia, on 20 March 1993. Bjørn Dæhlie of Norway won the overall men's event, and Lyubov Yegorova of Russia won the women's.

Calendar

Men

Women

Note: Until FIS Nordic World Ski Championships 1999, World Championship races are part of the World Cup. Hence results from those races are included in the World Cup overall.

Men's team

Women's team

Overall standings

Men's standings

Women's standings

Achievements
Victories in this World Cup (all-time number of victories as of 1992/93 season in parentheses)

Men
 , 5 (16) first places
 , 2 (12) first places
 , 2 (9) first places
 , 1 (9) first place
 , 1 (4) first place
 , 1 (2) first place
 , 1 (1) first place

Women
 , 4 (7) first places
 , 3 (22) first places
 , 3 (9) first places
 , 1 (2) first place
 , 1 (1) first place

References

FIS Cross-Country World Cup seasons
World Cup 1992-93
World Cup 1992-93